The Seven chieftains of the Magyars (or Hungarians) were the leaders of the seven tribes of the Hungarians at the time of their arrival in the Carpathian Basin in AD 895. Constantine VII, emperor of the Byzantine Empire names the seven tribes in his De Administrando Imperio, a list that can be verified with names of Hungarian settlements. The names of the chieftains, however, are not precisely known, as the chronicles include contradictory lists, some of which have been found to be false.

Chieftains
Constantine VII does not give the names of the chieftains of the Hungarian tribes, but describes some aspects of the leadership.

According to Anonymus
A Hungarian chronicler known as Anonymus, author of Gesta Hungarorum, names the seven chieftains as:

 Álmos, father of Árpád
 Előd, father of Szabolcs
 Ond, father of Ete
 Kend (Kond, Kund), father of Korcán (Kurszán) and Kaplon
 Tas, father of Lél (Lehel)
 Huba
 Tétény (Töhötöm), father of Horka

Most probably all persons on this list were real and significant personalities, but the list, as that of the seven chieftains who started the conquest of the Carpathian Basin, is certainly false. Constantine VII names Tas as a grandson of Árpád. The relations of the early Hungarian leaders are subject of debate between historians.

According to Simon of Kéza
Hungarian chronicler Simon of Kéza names seven captains who led seven tribes in the Gesta Hunnorum et Hungarorum:

 Árpád, son of Álmos, who was the son of Előd, who was the son of Ügyek
 Szabolcs
 Gyula
 Örs
 Künd, father of Kusid and Kupian
 Lél
 Vérbulcsú ("Blood-Bulcsú"), whose name's origin is that "his father was killed by Germans in the battle of Krimhild", and for revenge, "he drank the blood of some, like wine".

This list, having more legendary elements, is even less credible than that of Anonymus: only Árpád and Szabolcs match the time of the conquest.

According to Mark of Kalt
Hungarian chronicler Mark of Kalt names seven captains who led seven tribes in the Chronicon Pictum:

According to Johannes Thuróczy 
Hungarian chronicler Johannes Thuróczy names seven captains who led seven tribes in the Chronica Hungarorum:

Statues

In Budapest, Hungary, the Heroes' Square, better known as Hősök tere, has a representation of the different chieftains at the base of the column.
At the base of the column is a group of seven mounted figures representing the Magyar chieftains who led the Hungarian people into the Carpathian basin. In the front is Árpád, considered the founder of the Hungarian nation. Behind him are the chieftains Előd, Ond, Kond, Tas, Huba, and Töhötöm (Tétény). Little survives in the historical record about these individuals and both their costumes and their horses are considered to be more fanciful than historically accurate.

See also
 Hősök tere
 Magyar tribes

References

 01
Prehistoric Hungary